La Reunion (English: The Meeting): La Réunion (French) or La Reunión (Spanish), may refer to:

La Réunion, an island in the Indian Ocean east of Madagascar, that is an overseas department of France
La Reunion (Dallas), a communal settlement near present-day Dallas, Texas
La Réunion, Lot-et-Garonne, a town in the Lot-et-Garonne department of France
La Reunión, a village in Huiramba (municipality), Mexico
La Reunión (album), a 2007 album by reggaeton duo Yaga & Mackie

See also
Reunion (disambiguation)